The Coeur d'Alene is a U.S. National Forest located in the Idaho panhandle and is one of three forests that are aggregated into the Idaho Panhandle National Forests (the other two are the Kaniksu and St. Joe National Forests). Coeur d'Alene National Forest is located in Shoshone, Kootenai, and Bonner counties in northern Idaho. It has a total area of 726,362 acres (1,135 sq mi or 2,940 km2).

The forest headquarters is located in Coeur d'Alene, Idaho. There are local ranger district offices located in Coeur d'Alene and Silverton.

References

External links 
 
Coeur d'Alene River Ranger District - Idaho Panhandle National Forests

Protected areas of Bonner County, Idaho
Protected areas of Kootenai County, Idaho
National Forests of Idaho
Protected areas of Shoshone County, Idaho
Idaho Panhandle National Forest
Protected areas established in 1906
1906 establishments in Idaho
Coeur d'Alene, Idaho